is a Japanese manga series written and illustrated by Aki Irie. It started serialization in Harta before moving to Aokishi following its establishment in April 2021. As of November 2022, the chapters of the series have been collected into six volumes.

Plot
Kei Miyama is a Japanese teenager living in Iceland with his grandfather. He works as a private investigator, using his supernatural ability to communicate with machinery. The story follows Kei as he solves cases for various clients, often requiring him to track people down. At the same time, a deeper mystery is unfolding — one that involves his elusive younger brother, Michitaka. Despite appearing beautiful and sweet, Michitaka hides a sinister side to him and is wanted by the police.

Publication
The series is written and illustrated by Aki Irie. It started serialization in Harta on March 14, 2016. In April 2021, Kadokawa launched a new magazine, titled Aokishi. When it launched, the series was transferred into the magazine. The first tankōbon volume was released on October 13, 2017. As of November 2022, six tankōbon volumes  have  been  released.

At Anime Central 2018, Vertical announced they licensed the series for English publication.

Volume list

Reception
Danica Davidson from Otaku USA praised the series, calling it "very interesting". Katherine Dacey from Manga Critic also praised the first volume for its plot and characters. Koiwai from Manga News concurred with Dacey, praising the plot and characters. Faustine Lillaz from Planete BD concurred with previous critics, calling the plot and artwork "breathtaking".

In the 2019 issue of Kono Manga ga Sugoi!, the series ranked eleventh on the list of top manga for male readers. The series was also nominated for the Manga Taishō in the same year. In December 2020, the series ranked 50th in the top manga rankings by Kadokawa's Da Vinci magazine. The next year, in December 2021, the series ranked 48th in the same Da Vinci magazine ranking.

References

External links
 

Adventure anime and manga
Comics set in Iceland
Drama anime and manga
Enterbrain manga
Mystery anime and manga
Seinen manga
Vertical (publisher) titles